Backyard Sports (originally branded as Junior Sports) is a video game series released for consoles, computers and mobile devices. The series is best known for starring kid-sized versions of popular professional sports stars, such as Albert Pujols, Paul Pierce, Barry Bonds, Tim Duncan, Clint Mathis, Kevin Garnett, Tom Brady, David Ortiz, Joe Thornton and Andy Macdonald. The Backyard Sports series is licensed by the major professional U.S. sports leagues: Major League Baseball (MLB), the National Basketball Association (NBA), the National Football League (NFL), the National Hockey League (NHL), and Major League Soccer (MLS).

The series includes Backyard Baseball, Backyard Basketball, Backyard Football (American football), Backyard Soccer (association football), Backyard Hockey (ice hockey), and Backyard Skateboarding. In the games, players form a team consisting of Backyard Kids and pro players, which they take through a "Backyard League" season, attempting to become the champions. Players can create their athletes, starting in Backyard Football (1999). Another aspect of the games is the use of Power-Ups, allowing players to gain "Super-abilities". For instance, "Super Dunk" allows a basketball player to make a dunk from nearly anywhere on the court, "Leap Frog" allows a football player to jump over the entire defensive line, and "Ice Cream Truck" causes the other team to be distracted for a brief period.

Some of these games are playable with ScummVM.

History
The series began in late 1997 when Humongous Entertainment, owned by GT Interactive, created the first game in the franchise: Backyard Baseball. Later, GT Interactive was purchased by Infogrames. Infogrames allowed Humongous Entertainment to expand the series, and Humongous developed more titles such as Backyard Soccer, Backyard Hockey, Backyard Skateboarding, Backyard Basketball and Backyard Football. Following the buyout by Infogrames, these titles from the Backyard series were released for game consoles, including the GameCube, Game Boy Advance, PlayStation 2, Xbox 360, and Wii. Infogrames in North America eventually changed its name to Atari Interactive.

In July 2013, private equity firm The Evergreen Group bought the Backyard Sports franchise during the Atari bankruptcy proceedings for its portfolio company Epic Gear LLC.  It was later sold by Epic Gear to Day6 Sports Group.

In December 2014, Day6 Sports Group began to relaunch the Backyard Sports series with Backyard Sports NBA Basketball for smartphones and tablets, with Golden State Warriors point guard Stephen Curry as the cover athlete.

In 2016, Day6 Sports Group was acquired by European investment group.

In April 2019, Humongous Entertainment tweeted an image of the original Junior Sports logo, hinting at a possible re-release of the original games and/or the developer having re-secured the rights to the series proper. However a week prior, Humongous replied to a Twitter post saying they didn't own the rights to the franchise.

Games in the series

Film
In 2016, Cross Creek Pictures and Crystal City Entertainment were developing a film based on Backyard Sports with producers Brian Oliver and Ari Daniel Pinchot.

References

External links
  (2007 archive on the Internet Archive's Wayback Machine)
 

Video game franchises
Humongous Entertainment games
Infogrames games
Atari games
Fantasy sports video games
Video game franchises introduced in 1997
Video games developed in the United States